Sámal Pætursson Lamhauge (died 1752 in Lamba) was Lawman of the Faroe Islands from 1706 to 1752.

Lamhauge was the father-in-law of Hans Jákupsson Debes, who followed him in the post.

He was the longest serving lawman of the Faroe Islands, serving for 46 years.

References

Løgtingið 150 – Hátíðarrit. Tórshavn 2002, Bind 2, S. 366. (Avsnitt Føroya løgmenn fram til 1816) (PDF-Download)

1752 deaths
Lawmen of the Faroe Islands
Year of birth unknown